Peter Holečko (born 13 January 1982) is a Slovak professional ice hockey forward.

Holečko played in the Slovak Extraliga for HC Košice, HK Dubnica, MHC Martin, MHk 32 Liptovský Mikuláš and HK Poprad as well as in the Elite Ice Hockey League for the Edinburgh Capitals.

References

External links
 

1982 births
Living people
Edinburgh Capitals players
HC Košice players
HC Morzine-Avoriaz players
HK Poprad players
HK Spišská Nová Ves players
MHC Martin players
MHk 32 Liptovský Mikuláš players
Slovak ice hockey forwards
Sportspeople from Spišská Nová Ves
Slovak expatriate sportspeople in Scotland
Slovak expatriate sportspeople in France
Slovak expatriate ice hockey people
Expatriate ice hockey players in Scotland
Expatriate ice hockey players in France